{{Automatic taxobox
|image =菱葉石斛 Dendrobium anceps -香港沙田洋蘭展 Shatin Orchid Show, Hong Kong- (9216111030).jpg
|image_caption = Dendrobium anceps
|taxon = Dendrobium sect. Aporum
|authority = Lindley 1850 
|subdivision_ranks = Species
|subdivision = See text
|type_species =Dendrobium lobatum
|synonyms ={{Collapsible list|
Aporosis 
Aporum 
Macrostomium 
Orthoglottis Shismoceras Dendrobium sect. Aporopsis Dendrobium sect. Hemiphylla Dendrobium sect. Holophylla Dendrobium sect. Macrostomium Dendrobium sect. Rhopalanthe Dendrobium subsect. Aporosis Dendrobium sect. Strongyle Dendrobium sect. Strongyle Dendrobium sect. Aporum Dendrobium sect. Strongyle Dendrobium subgenus Xerobium Dendrobium subsect. Strongyle  
}}
}}Dendrobium section Aporum is a section of the genus Dendrobium.

Description
Plants in this section have compact short stems with slender and many leaves, leaves sheathing at the base, short single flower inflorescence. Lip not mobile.

Distribution
Plants from this section are found in India, continental Southeast Asia, Malaysia, Singapore, Brunei, the Philippines, Indonesia, Papua New Guinea.

SpeciesDendrobium section Aporum'' comprises the following species:

References

Orchid subgenera